Calcium and integrin-binding protein 1 is a protein that in humans is encoded by the CIB1 gene.

The protein encoded by this gene is a member of the calcium-binding protein family.  The specific function of this protein has not yet been determined; however this protein is known to interact with DNA-dependent protein kinase and may play a role in kinase-phosphatase regulation of DNA end-joining.  This protein also interacts with integrin alpha(IIb)beta(3), which may implicate this protein as a regulatory molecule for alpha(IIb)beta(3).

Interactions
CIB1 has been shown to interact with RAC3, PSEN2, DNA-PKcs, UBR5 and CD61.

References

Further reading

External links
 

EF-hand-containing proteins